Established alternatives to car use include cycling, walking, kick scooters, rollerblading, skateboarding, twikes and (electric or internal combustion) motorcycles. Other alternatives are public transport vehicles (buses, guided buses, trolleybuses, trains, subways, monorails, tramways).

History

Prior to the popularity of car use which dominated motorised transport (and consequently urban planning) from around the 1950s onwards, several transportation modes were used. Pedestrianism for both short and long distances was used, but also travel by horse especially for long distances. Trams, especially powered trams, achieved widespread popularity in the 19th century. Carriages, used for centuries, are still used but mainly for tourism.

Public transport

The public transport with the highest modal share worldwide is travelling by bus followed by travelling by rail due to infrastructure cost. A pedestrian form of public transport is a walking bus predominantly used by schools. An attempt to transform private transport by bicycle into public transport has been bicycle sharing schemes.
Bicycle-sharing systems have been implemented in over 1000 cities worldwide, and are especially common in many European and Chinese cities of all sizes. Similar programs have been implemented across the United States as well, including large cities like Washington, D.C., and New York City, as well as smaller cities like Buffalo, New York and Fort Collins, Colorado.

Personal rapid transit is a scheme that has been discussed, in which small, automated vehicles would run on special elevated tracks spaced within walking distance throughout a city, and could provide direct service to a chosen station without stops. However, despite several concepts existing for decades personal rapid transit has failed to gain significant ground and several prototypes and experimental systems have been dismantled as failures.

Private transport

Unmotorised

The private transport with the highest modal share, worldwide that is unmotorised, is pedestrianism followed by cycling.

Motorised

Another possibility is forms of personal transport such as the electric skateboard/mountainboard, electric kick scooter, or personal transporters, such as self-balancing unicycles (i.e. Segway PT and others), which could serve as an alternative to cars and bicycles if they prove to be socially accepted.

Electric or internal combustion motorcycles (which also include scooters) are also an option. Internal combustion motorcycles do create some degree of local air pollution however. That said, the degree of local air pollution varies considerably depending on which fuel (i.e. gasoline, LPG, CNG/biogas, hydrogen) is injected to the internal combustion engine. This fuel can be freely chosen, and existing motorcycle engine can be converted to run on these. Hydrogen for instance is described as being "near-emissionless" when burned in an internal combustion engine.

Also, velomobiles exist (including electric assisted versions), which compared to regular bicycles have the benefit of being enclosed (hence protecting the driver from the weather), and the potential of being motorized, which can allow one to travel greater distances (at a faster speed).

Benefits
All of these alternative modes of transport pollute less than at least the petroleum-powered car and contribute to transport sustainability. They also provide other significant benefits such as reduced traffic-related injuries and fatalities, reduced space requirements, both for parking and driving, reduced resource usage and pollution related to both manufacturing and driving, increased social inclusion, increased economic and social equity, and more livable streets and cities. Some alternative modes of transportation, especially cycling, also provide regular, low-impact exercise, tailored to the needs of human bodies. Public transport is also linked to increased exercise, because they are combined in a multi-modal transport chain that includes walking or cycling.

According to the MIT Future Car Workshop, the benefits of possible future car technologies not yet in widespread use (such as zero-emissions vehicles) over these alternatives, would be:
 Increased mobility in rural settings and in some other areas where traffic jams are not severe
 Possibly higher social status 
 Overall a better provision for privacy
 Profit for the multinational firms producing cars, and possibly for their employees

See also 

 Bike lane
 Bus rapid transit
 Car costs
 Car dependency
 Car-free movement
 Cycling infrastructure
 Effects of the car on societies
 Electric bicycle
 Environmental effects of transport
 Environmental movement
 Environmentalism
 Green vehicle
 Human–electric hybrid vehicle
 List of emerging technologies – Transport
 Manufacturing emissions of electric cars
 Noise pollution
 
 Sustainable transport
 Removal of curbside parking spaces: frees up space for bicycle lanes

References 

Sustainable transport
Cycling